Harry Saltau (17 September 1891 – 25 July 1956) was an Australian rules footballer who played with South Melbourne in the Victorian Football League (VFL).

Saltau, a Port Melbourne junior, appeared in two grand finals during his brief league career. He was a back pocket in South Melbourne's 1912 and 1914 VFL Grand Final losses.

References

External links

1891 births
Australian rules footballers from Victoria (Australia)
Sydney Swans players
1956 deaths
People from Warrnambool